Schwarze Pumpe power station ( translated: Black Pump Power Station) is a modern lignite (brown coal)–fired power station in the "Schwarze Pumpe" (Black Pump) district in Spremberg, Germany consisting of 2 × 800 megawatts (MW) units. The current plant came into service in 1997–1998 and was built by Siemens. The power station was sold by Vattenfall to the Czech energy group EPH and its financial partner PPF Investments on 30September 2016.

The site has been a large-scale industrial site processing lignite since the DDR period, when it was first developed (since 1955). The DDR-era plant used the lignite to produce high temperature lignite coke for blast furnaces, coal gas to fire steam turbine electrical generation, motor fuels, and a variety of chemical feedstocks.

Carbon capture and storage pilot plant 
Construction started on 26 May 2006, in the Schwarze Pumpe industrial area, on the oxy-fuel combustion process carbon capture and storage pilot plant. With a thermal power of 30 MW, the plant burned coal with pure oxygen (nitrogen-free) gas replacing air in what is known as oxy-fuel combustion.  The idea was that the resulting carbon dioxide would be compressed and liquefied. It would then be put into geologic formations and stored so as not to contribute to global warming. The aim of the plant wasn't to produce electricity but to produce steam which would then be used by nearby industry.

Vattenfall stopped carbon capture R&D at the plant in 2014 because they found that "its costs and the energy it requires make the technology unviable".

The facility was meant to serve as a prototype for larger power plants. Back in 2005 environmentalists criticized the facility. In their opinion a greater impact on the reduction of global warming could have been obtained for the same money through investments in renewable energies and efficient power production and use.

Criticisms 

On 13–15 May 2016, 3,500–4,000 environmental activists blocked the open-pit coal mine and the Schwarze Pumpe power station to limit climate change.  This protest was known as Ende Gelände 2016.

On 14May 2016 Vattenfall reported that environmental campaigners tried to force the power plant to shut down by occupying the coal transport railway tracks into the plant. 120 people were arrested. 2,000 climate activists occupied different areas of the nearby mine Welzow-Süd and the rails of the coal transport trains in order to stop the fuel supply to the power plant Schwarze Pumpe and thereby enforce a stop of plant operation.

References

External links 

Coal-fired power stations in Germany
Vattenfall
Economy of Brandenburg
Buildings and structures in Spree-Neiße
Spremberg
Energetický a průmyslový holding